The Flores tiger (Parantica wegneri) is a species of nymphalid butterfly in the Danainae subfamily. It is endemic to Flores, Indonesia.

References

Parantica
Butterflies of Indonesia
Endemic fauna of Indonesia
Taxonomy articles created by Polbot
Butterflies described in 1960